Award Winner: Stan Getz is a 1957 album by Stan Getz.

Track listing 
 "Where or When" (Lorenz Hart, Richard Rodgers) – 7:11
 "Woody 'n' You" (Dizzy Gillespie) – 7:08
 "Smiles" (J. Will Callahan, Lee Roberts) – 4:48
 "Three Little Words" (Bert Kalmar, Harry Ruby) – 6:59
 "Time After Time" (Sammy Cahn, Jule Styne) – 6:45
 "This Can't Be Love" (Hart, Rodgers) – 9:19
 "All God's Chillun Got Rhythm" (Walter Jurmann, Gus Kahn, Bronisław Kaper) – 7:42 bonus track on the CD
 "But Beautiful" (Johnny Burke, Jimmy Van Heusen) – 5:31 bonus track on the CD
Studio outtakes included on the 2000 CD reissue:
 "Woody 'n' You" (alternate take) – 7:10
 "Time After Time" (alternate take) – 6:57
 "All God's Chillun Got Rhythm" (false start) – :34
 "Smiles" (false start) – :20
 "Time After Time" (false start) – :42
 "Woody 'n' You" (false start) – :27
 "Woody 'n' You" (inserts) – 2:43

Personnel 
 Stan Getz – tenor saxophone
 Lou Levy – piano
 Leroy Vinnegar – double bass
 Stan Levey – drums

References 

1957 albums
Stan Getz albums
Albums produced by Norman Granz
Verve Records albums